The South McAlester Miners, not to be confused with the McAlester Miners, were a Class-D South Central League professional baseball team based in South McAlester, Oklahoma, United States that existed in 1906. They were managed by former major league third baseman Jud Smith.

Their first scheduled game was on May 1 against the Fort Smith Razorbacks. They folded in August with the league, finishing in first place with a 59-32 record.

References

Baseball teams established in 1906
Defunct minor league baseball teams
Pittsburg County, Oklahoma
Professional baseball teams in Oklahoma
Defunct baseball teams in Oklahoma
1906 establishments in Indian Territory